Arthur Triffitt (17 March 1914 – 12 March 1973) was an Australian cricketer. He played one first-class match for Tasmania in 1950/51.

See also
 List of Tasmanian representative cricketers

References

External links
 

1914 births
1973 deaths
Australian cricketers
Tasmania cricketers
Cricketers from Tasmania